James Streshly Jackson (September 27, 1823 – October 8, 1862) was a U.S. Representative from Kentucky and a brigadier general in the Union Army during the American Civil War.

Biography
Born in Fayette County, Kentucky, Jackson pursued classical studies at Centre College, Danville, Kentucky. He graduated from Jefferson College, Canonsburg, Pennsylvania, in 1844, and the following year from the law department of Transylvania University, Lexington, Kentucky. He was admitted to the bar and began practicing law in Greenupsburg, Kentucky.

During the Mexican–American War, Jackson enlisted on June 9, 1846, as a private in the 1st Kentucky Cavalry; he was elected a third lieutenant one month later.  Jackson participated in a duel with Captain Thomas Francis Marshall; fearing a court martial, he resigned from the Army on October 10, 1846.

In 1859, he moved to Hopkinsville from Greenupsburg.  He was elected as a Unionist to the Thirty-seventh Congress and served from March 4 to December 13, 1861, when he resigned to enter the Union Army.

Jackson raised a cavalry company and was elected colonel of the 3rd Kentucky Cavalry when it was formed on December 13, 1861. He was promoted to brigadier general of volunteers on July 16, 1862.

Jackson was placed in command of the 10th Division in the Army of the Ohio. He was killed in action on October 8, 1862, during the Battle of Perryville. He was buried at Cave Hill Cemetery in Louisville, but was reinterred on March 24, 1863 at Riverside Cemetery in Hopkinsville.

See also

List of American Civil War generals (Union)
Kentucky in the American Civil War

References

Bibliography
 Retrieved on 2008-02-12

External links
"Union General James S. Jackson: Fateful Day at Perryville" — Article by Civil War historian/author Bryan S. Bush

1823 births
1862 deaths
People from Fayette County, Kentucky
Unionist Party members of the United States House of Representatives from Kentucky
Kentucky lawyers
Kentucky Unionists
American military personnel of the Mexican–American War
Union Army generals
People of Kentucky in the American Civil War
Centre College alumni
Washington & Jefferson College alumni
Transylvania University alumni
People from Greenup, Kentucky
People from Hopkinsville, Kentucky
Union military personnel killed in the American Civil War
19th-century American politicians
United States politicians killed during the Civil War
19th-century American lawyers
Members of the United States House of Representatives from Kentucky